Where the Spirit Lives is a 1989 television film about Aboriginal children in Canada being taken from their tribes to attend residential schools for assimilation into majority culture. Written by Keith Ross Leckie and directed by Bruce Pittman, it aired on CBC Television on October 29, 1989. It was also shown in the United States on PBS on June 6, 1990, as part of the American Playhouse series and was screened at multiple film festivals in Canada and the United States.

The film stars Michelle St. John as Amelia, a young Kainai girl captured and confined to the residential school system of the 1930s. The system was an attempt to have aboriginal youth to assimilate into the majority European-Canadian culture.  Amelia resists assimilation and plans her escape. The film's cast includes Ann-Marie MacDonald and David Hemblen as teachers at the school.

Plot
In 1937, a young Kainai girl named Ashtoh-Komi (Michelle St. John) is kidnapped along with several other children from a village as part of a Canadian policy to educate Aboriginal children and assimilate them into Canadian/British society. She is taken to a boarding school, where she is forced to adopt Western, Eurocentric ways and learn English, often under harsh treatment. Combined with the rejection of her peers (as she is a so-called "Bush Indian" who has not learnt white customs), Komi attempts to escape one night on foot with her little brother, Pita (Clayton Julian). However her plan is quickly foiled as the Indian Agent assigned to the school, Taggert (Ron White), catches up and brings them back to the school, where Komi is subjected to further punishment. Eventually Rachel (Heather Hess), Komi's only ally among the students, plead with the teachers to free her by promising to teach Komi to behave.

One teacher, Kathleen Gwillimbury (Ann-Marie MacDonald), is portrayed as sympathetic and she becomes repelled by the bigotry of others at the school. She offers Komi help in the form of giving her English lessons which culminate in cultural exchange, where Kathleen learns Kainai words from Komi in exchange for her learning their English counterparts. Now Amelia, Komi improves her English quickly with the kindness and support of her teacher, gradually adjusting to the school environment while retaining her Kainai identity. However, when Amelia learns that the teachers lied to her by telling her her parents had died, she decides to escape again, this time successfully.

Cast
Michelle St. John – Ashtoh-Komi/Amelia
Kim Bruisedhead Fox – Anataki
Clayton Julian – Pita/Abraham
Ron White – Taggert
Ann-Marie MacDonald – Kathleen Gwillimbury
Doris Petrie – Miss Weir
Chapelle Jaffe – Miss Appleby
David Hemblen – Reverend Buckley
John Friesen – Mr. Babcock
Patricia Collins – Mrs. Barrington
Graham Greene – Komi's father
Heather Hess – Rachel

Production
The idea for the film originated when the producers and screenwriter were working on the 13-episode CBC television series Spirit Bay, which focused on native children growing up on a Northern Ontario Indian reserve. They "kept hearing bitter stories about residential schools" and were inspired to tell a story about that system in a film.

Primary financing for the film's $2.6 million budget was provided by Telefilm Canada ($1.25 million) and the CBC ($500,000), who secured first rights to the film. Other financing came from the Ontario Film Development Corporation, Mid-Canada TV, and Atlantis Releasing. Canadian film director and producer Norman Jewison "personally contributed $12,500, half the cost of making a theatrical print for film festivals", with the other half supplied by the Ontario Film Development Corp.

The film began shooting on September 26, 1988. Locations included Waterton Lakes National Park in southern Alberta and Toronto.

Screenings
Although created for television, the film was shot in 35 mm and as a result was able to be screened in theaters. It was shown at various film festivals in Canada and the United States from 1989 through 2002. It was also screened at some colleges and universities, as part of college film festivals, classes, or special events related to Indigenous or Native American studies.

Awards
The film won nine awards and was nominated for two additional awards.

See also 
Sleeping Children Awake, a 1992 documentary about residential schools
We Were Children, a 2012 Canadian documentary about residential schools
Our Spirits Don't Speak English (2008), a documentary film about Native American boarding schools in the United States.

References

External links
Where the Spirit Lives, Screen Door Website

1989 films
CBC Television original films
First Nations films
Assimilation of indigenous peoples of North America
1989 drama films
English-language Canadian films
Gemini and Canadian Screen Award for Best Television Film or Miniseries winners
Canadian drama television films
1989 television films
Works about residential schools in Canada
1980s English-language films
Films directed by Bruce Pittman
1980s Canadian films